Janka is a village, in Khejuri II CD block in Contai subdivision of Purba Medinipur district in the state of West Bengal, India. Khejuri police station is located at Janka.

Geography

Police station
Khejuri police station is located at Janka. It has jurisdiction over Khejuri I and Khejuri II CD Blocks. It covers an area of 268.47 km2 with a population of  231,777.

CD block HQ
The headquarters of Khejuri II CD block are located at Janka.

Urbanisation
93.55% of the population of Contai subdivision live in the rural areas. Only 6.45% of the population live in the urban areas and it is considerably behind Haldia subdivision in urbanization, where 20.81% of the population live in urban areas.

Note: The map alongside presents some of the notable locations in the subdivision. All places marked in the map are linked in the larger full screen map.

Demographics
As per 2011 Census of India Janka had a total population of 2,804 of which 1,452 (52%) were males and 1,352 (48%) were females. Population below 6 years was 347. The total number of literates in Janka was 2,214 (90.11% of the population over 6 years).

Healthcare
There is a primary health centre at Janka (with 10 beds).

References

Villages in Purba Medinipur district